Reuben Hallam (1818 – 1908), also known as Wadsley Jack, was an English carver, cutler, musician and author, from the Wadsley district of Sheffield, England, who wrote in the Sheffield dialect. He is best known for the autobiographical work Wadsley Jack; or, the Humours and Adventures of a Travelling Cutler.

Wadsley Jack..., and its sequel Wadsley Jack's Married Life, were each serialised in the Sheffield Daily Telegraph in 1865 and 1866 respectively, prior to publication in book form.

In various decennial censuses, Hallam is listed as:
 1851 a teacher of singing
 1861 a spring knife cutler
 1871 a spring knife cutler
 1881 an artist (as are three of his children)
 1891 a weighman
 1901 a spring knife cutler

He also worked as an organist, orator and singer.

His portrait, in oil on canvas, by W. Lindley, is in the collection of Museums Sheffield. Another portrait of Hallam, by Willis Eadon, was exhibited at the August 1888 Sheffield Society of Artists' exhibition. The Sheffield Daily Telegraph'''s unnamed reviewer wrote that "it shows evidence of rather clever treatment in bringing out a strong individuality". Reviewing the same exhibition, The Sheffield and Rotherham Independent referred to Hallam as "a local celebrity".

A pub in Wadsley, The Wadsley Jack, formerly The Star, was renamed in his honour.

 Works 

 
 

 References 

 External links 
 ArtUK discussion of the Lindley portrait 
 T'Days ov Ahr Fathers'' newspaper article by Hallam, in dialect

1818 births
Place of birth missing
1908 deaths
Place of death missing
People from Wadsley
19th-century English writers
Cutlers
English classical organists
19th-century organists
19th-century British male musicians
Musicians from Sheffield